Gandaca is a genus of butterflies in the family Pieridae.

Species
Gandaca butyrosa (Butler, 1875)
Gandaca harina (Horsfield, 1829)

References

Coliadinae
Pieridae genera
Taxa named by Frederic Moore